Djot is a lightweight markup language that aims to improve on CommonMark's syntax where it is complex and difficult to parse efficiently. It was created in 2022 by John MacFarlane, the author of Pandoc and a member of the CommonMark standardization group.

It derives most of its features from CommonMark, but includes a wider set of features, including description lists, footnotes, tables, several new kinds of inline formatting, math and smart punctuation.

The original reference implementation is written in a scripting language (Lua), but the language is designed to parse efficiently, so it is very fast.

The code and documentation are released under the MIT License.

Difference from CommonMark 
Djot's syntax is similar to CommonMark's, but there are some differences.

Blank lines 
CommonMark does not need blank lines around block-level elements, but Djot does.

Example:

Headings 
Djot has no setext (= or -) headings, only ATX (#) headings.

Example:

Emphasis 
CommonMark uses single * or _ for emphasis, and double * or _ for strong emphasis. Djot uses single _ for emphasis, and single * for strong emphasis.

Example:

Links 
Unlike CommonMark, Djot has no special syntax for adding a title to a link. A title can be added by using the general attribute syntax instead.

Example:

Examples

Implementations

References

External links 

 

Lightweight markup languages
Open formats